Sumber is a district which serves as the regency seat of the Cirebon Regency of West Java, Indonesia. It is divided into 14 villages which are as follows:

Babakan
Gegunung
Kaliwadas
Kemantren
Kenanga
Matangaji
Pasalakan
Pejambon
Perbutulan
Sendang
Sidawangi
Sumber
Tukmudal
Watubelah

Climate
Sumber has a tropical monsoon climate (Am) with moderate to little rainfall from June to October and heavy to very heavy rainfall from November to May.

References

Cirebon Regency
Populated places in West Java
Regency seats of West Java